Elena Pankratova is a Russian soprano, born in Yekaterinburg. She initially studied conducting and piano before graduating as a singer and actress from the Saint Petersburg Conservatory. In the 2013/14 season she made her Royal Opera House debut as Barak's Wife in Richard Strauss's Die Frau ohne Schatten, a role she sang in 2012 at the premiere of the same production at La Scala, Milan. As of 2018, for third year in a row, Pankratova sung as Kundry in Parsifal.

References

Living people
Russian operatic sopranos
Saint Petersburg Conservatory alumni
Musicians from Yekaterinburg
21st-century Russian  women opera singers
Year of birth missing (living people)